Keith Raphael Briffa (27 December 1952 – 29 October 2017) was a climatologist and deputy director of the Climatic Research Unit. He authored or co-authored over 130 scholarly articles, chapters and books.  In his professional work, he focused on climate variability in the late Holocene, with a special focus on northern portions of Europe and Asia. Briffa's preferred method was dendroclimatology, which is a set of procedures intended to decode information about the past climate from tree rings. Briffa helped develop data sets from trees from Canada, Fennoscandia, and northern Siberia which have been used in climate research.

Briffa grew up in Speke, and attended St Francis Xavier's College, Liverpool. He studied biological sciences at the University of East Anglia. He completed his PhD at the University of East Anglia entitled "Tree-climate relationships and dendroclimatological reconstruction in British Isles" in 1984.

From 1994 to 2000, Briffa served on the scientific steering committee (SSC) of the PAGES project; more recently he also served on SSCs for the UK NERC Rapid Climate Change and the European Science Foundation's HOLIVAR program.

Briffa served as Lead Author on chapter 6 (Paleoclimatology) of working group I of the 2007 IPCC Fourth Assessment Report of the Intergovernmental Panel on Climate Change.

Briffa previously served as associate editor of the scholarly journals The Holocene, Boreas and Dendrochronologia.

He had an h-index of 81 according to Semantic Scholar.

Selected publications

References

External links 
 Keith Briffa web page

1952 births
2017 deaths
Alumni of the University of East Anglia
Academics of the University of East Anglia
Intergovernmental Panel on Climate Change lead authors